Ropes are groups of yarns, plies, fibers or strands that are twisted or braided together into larger and stronger forms.

Ropes or The Ropes may also refer to:
 Ropes (surname)
 Rope (rhythmic gymnastics), a rhythmic gymnastics apparatus
 Rope (torture), an instrument of torture used by the Huguenots
 Rope (unit), any of several units of measurement
 Rope (data structure), a data structure used for fast string operations
 The Ropes, an indie rock band from New York

See also 
Nathaniel Ropes Building, a commercial building in Cincinnati, Ohio
On the Ropes (disambiguation)
Ropes course
 Ropes Creek, a creek in New South Wales
Ropes Crossing, New South Wales
Ropes End, a summer house in Phippsburg, Maine
Ropes Mansion, a mansion in Salem, Massachusetts